Etrich Flugzeugwerke (EFW) was a short-lived aircraft manufacturer founded by Igo Etrich.

The company became part of Brandenburgische Flugzeugwerke in 1914, which then, in turn, became part of Hansa-Brandenburg.

Some of the planes were manufactured in Trautenau (today Trutnov, Czech Republic) and others in Liebau (today Lubawka, Poland).

Aircraft produced
 Etrich Taube 1910
 Etrich VII 1911
 Luft-Limousine 1912
 Sport-Taube 1929

See also
Volksflugzeug

Footnotes

References
  
 
 

Defunct aircraft manufacturers of Austria